Ollie Chester Klee (May 20, 1900 – February 9, 1977) was an outfielder in Major League Baseball. Nicknamed "Babe", he played for the Cincinnati Reds.

Klee attended the University of Ohio circa 1922-1924, but was known as a star football player. He was an honorable mention for All-American halfback in 1924. He also played some baseball at university.

References

External links

1900 births
1977 deaths
Major League Baseball outfielders
Cincinnati Reds players
Toledo Mud Hens players
Baseball players from Ohio
People from Piqua, Ohio
Ohio State Buckeyes baseball players